Jörn Arnecke (born 1973, Hameln) is a German composer. Arnecke is the professor of music theory, aural training, and historical music theory at the Hochschule für Musik Franz Liszt, Weimar.

Life
Arnecke studied composition and musical theory in Hamburg, Germany, at the Academy for Music and Theatre (Hochschule für Musik und Theater Hamburg) under Volkhardt Preuß and Peter Michael Hamel. In 1997/98, during his study, he was a student of Gérard Grisey at the Conservatoire National Superieur in Paris. Arnecke graduated in 2000 and since 2001 he has been part-time professor at the music academy in Hamburg. 2004 he was given a scholarship by the Bundeskünstlerförderung (federal artist support) for the Deutsches Studienzentrum in Venice and in 2007 one for Casa Baldi near Rome. During his studies and later on he has won many prizes, for example the Preis des Landesverbandes Sachen des Deutschen Tonträgerverbandes in 1999.

Major works

Opera
 Ariadne (1999)
 opera scene, recited poems: Paul Heyse, Adelbert von Chamisso & Joseph von Eichendorff, written for the Munich Biennale, dedicated to Peter Michael Hamel
 Le Nozze di Figaro (1999)
 Opera by W. A. Mozart, arrangement for 12 instruments
 Das Fest im Meer (2001/02)
 musical theatre in 3 sections by Francis Hüsers, from John Bergers novel "To the Wedding", written for Hamburgische Staatsoper (national opera Hamburg)
 Butterfly Blues (2004)
 musical theatre in 8 scenes after the play by Henning Mankell, German lyrics: Claudia Romeder; written for Hamburgische Staatsoper
 Unter Eis (2006/07)
 musical theatre in 13 scenes, libretto: Falk Richter; written for Ruhr Triennale in cooperation with  Oper Frankfurt

Orchestra
 Nachtferne (1996)
 Frage (1997/98)
 awarded the Förderpreis des Göttinger Symphonie Orchesters
 Folie (2000)
 written for Festival junger Künstler Bayreuth, dedicated to Sissy Thammer & Professor Siegfried Palm
 Gezeiten (Tides) (2005)
 fantasia for orchestra, written for Theater und Philharmonisches Orchester Heidelberg
 Auf dem Wasser zu singen (2005/06)
 seven songs after Franz Schubert und Johannes Brahms for tenor & 18 strings, belongs to 9 Intermezzi "Zwischen den Wassern", lyrics: Friedrich Leopold zu Stollberg, Heinrich Heine, Wilhelm Müller, August von Platen, Robert Reinick & Johann Wolfgang von Goethe
 Zwischen den Wassern (2005/06)
 9 intermezzi for 18 strings
 Kristallisationen (2007/08)
 for clarinet, bassoon & orchestra, written for Philharmonisches Staatsorchester Hamburg

Ensemble
 Erstarrungen (2000)
 for soprano, speaker & chamber orchestra, lyrics: Wilhelm Müller & Rainer Kunze, written for Expo 2000
 Äther (2006)
 for soprano & chamber ensemble, lyrics: Hannah Dübgen, written for Ilse und Dr. Horst Rusch-Stiftung and the Scharoun Ensemble

Chamber music
 Einstimmig zweistimmig (1996)
 for 2 oboes
 Kreuzspiel (1996/97)
 for flute
 Strophen zum Wir (1998)
 after Rainer Maria Rilke
 In Stille – string quartet Nr. 1 (2002)
 written for Bayerische Staatsoper Munich
 Inschriften – string quartet Nr. 2 (2003)
 written for Tonhalle Düsseldorf
 Weißer Rauch (2003)
 for clarinet
 Schwerelos (2000/2005)
 3 pieces for harp
 Alea/Talea – trio for piano Nr. 1 (2005/06)
 written for Musikgemeinde Harburg

References

1973 births
German male composers
German composers
Living people
Pupils of Gérard Grisey